1st Ko Si 3rd (also known as Third Is My First)  is a 2014 Filipino comedy-drama film written and directed by Real Florido and produced by Anter San Agustin under Firestarters Productions. The film was an official selection to the 2014 Cinemalaya Independent Film Festival under the New Breed Category. It stars Nova Villa, Freddie Webb, Ken Chan, Dante Rivero, RJ Agustin and Denise Barbacena.

Plot

A woman is looking forward to settling into a long retirement with her husband. But she quickly grows restless, and when an old flame suddenly turns up, she comes to reassess her past.

Awards and festivals

References 

Philippine comedy-drama films